The New Zealand Treasury is the central public service department of New Zealand charged with advising the Government on economic policy, assisting with improving the performance of New Zealand's economy, and managing financial resources. The Minister responsible for the Treasury is the Minister of Finance of New Zealand; however, from 1996 to 2002, there existed a more specific position of Treasurer of New Zealand. The role was created for Winston Peters by the Fourth National Government under Jim Bolger after the 1996 election, and abolished by Helen Clark’s government in 2002. 

Treasury has four main functions:
 Provide advice to improve economic and fiscal conditions for high levels of economic growth and improved living standards.
 Monitor and manage the financial affairs of the Crown.
 Assess and test other Government agencies’ advice and proposals that have economic and financial implications.
 Provide leadership, with other central agencies, to develop a high-performing State sector.

History
The Treasury is one of New Zealand's oldest institutions, having been first established in 1840. Initially the Treasury consisted of just a few officials responsible for managing the Government's day-to-day financial affairs. In the 1920s the department took on a supervisory role over other departments’ spending and oversight of government borrowing.

However, the most dramatic change to the role of the Treasury came in the 1950s when the department began to develop its role as economic advisor to the Government. The Treasury "hit the spotlight" in this role during a wave of far-reaching, and often controversial, economic reforms in the 1980s and early 1990s. This period also coincided with a general shift towards higher scrutiny of government activity and performance, making the Finance portfolio and Treasury operations more transparent.

Since the 1950s, the Treasury has evolved from being a control agency to a "central agency". During this time, departments have become largely free to manage their own resources, with the Treasury's role being to provide central agency leadership, co-ordination and monitoring.

Between 2008 and 2011 Treasury administered the Crown Retail Deposit Guarantee Scheme. Under the scheme the government bailed out nine finance firms including South Canterbury Finance to the value of approximately $2 billion.

Today the Treasury employs 363 people, is the Government's lead advisor on economic and financial policy, and has the overall vision of helping governments achieve higher living standards for New Zealanders.

Role
Specific areas of work undertaken by the Treasury include:
 advice on the government's economic strategy and macroeconomic policies
 advice on financial and public sector management systems
 advice on tax strategy, including the objectives of the tax system and the choice and mix of taxes
 advice on Budget strategy and the design of the Budget process. This includes managing the Budget initiatives process and producing the Budget documents
 preparation and publication of macroeconomic, tax revenue and fiscal forecasts, and monitoring of the domestic and international economies
 preparation and publication of monthly and annual consolidated Crown financial statements
 management of the Crown's debt portfolio and associated financial investments
 management of commercial, contractual and Treaty of Waitangi-related claims against the Crown
 advice on the Crown's ownership interests in Crown companies including state-owned enterprises (SOEs), Crown financial institutions and Air New Zealand
 advice on policy interventions, departmental votes and Crown entities to ensure the state's resources and powers are used effectively to achieve the results sought by the elected Government.

Ministers
The Treasury serves 7 portfolios and 5 ministers.

List of Secretaries to the Treasury
The Secretary to the Treasury is the public service head of the department. The role was created in 1873 when the offices of paymaster-general and under treasurer were amalgamated.

Structure 
Senior leadership
 Secretary and Chief Executive
 Chief Economist and Deputy Secretary, Economic System
 Chief Operating Officer and Deputy Secretary, Strategy, Performance & Engagement
 Deputy Secretary, Budget & Public Services 
 Deputy Secretary, Financial & Commercial Operations
 Deputy Secretary, Growth & Public Services 
 Deputy Secretary, Macroeconomics & Growth

Units within the Treasury

Debt Management Office
The New Zealand Debt Management Office (NZDMO) is the part of The Treasury responsible for managing the Crown's debt, its cash flows and its interest-bearing deposits. The 1988 reforms of the Government's financial management led to its establishment with the aim of improving the management of the Government's debt portfolio.

Central Agencies Shared Services
Central Agencies Shared Services (CASS) is a shared services centre housed within the Treasury. Set up in March 2012, it provides information technology and management, human resources, and finance services to the Treasury, the Department of the Prime Minister and Cabinet, and the Public Service Commission. Aside from providing these services, the goal of CASS is to set an example for other state sector organisations in sharing service delivery functions.

Crown company monitoring
The Crown owns many companies, including state-owned enterprises, Crown entities, and Crown Research Institutes. The Treasury's Commercial Operations group assists the Crown in the running of these. This group includes what was the Crown Ownership Monitoring Unit (COMU, pronounced "co-moo") from November 2009 to February 2014, and before that the Crown Company Monitoring and Advisory Unit.

Controversies
The Treasury has courted controversy, particularly since the Rogernomics reforms of the 1980s. Given the agency's key influence and impact on fiscal policy, it has been accused by critics in recent years of inaccurate forecasts, regulatory capture and political partisanism, and accepting corporate gifts from the financial industry.

References

External links 

New Zealand Debt Management Office
Commercial Operations, The Treasury

Government of New Zealand
New Zealand
New Zealand Public Service departments